The 2019 European Parliament election in Bulgaria for the election of the 5th delegation from Bulgaria to the European Parliament were held on 26 May 2019. All seats were up for election. The country forms a single constituency, with members elected by proportional representation using open lists.

Outgoing delegation

Opinion polls

Vote share 
Among decided voters (figures adjusted where needed)

Results

See also 
 Bulgaria (European Parliament constituency)

References

External links 
 State Election Commission 

Bulgaria
2019
2019 elections in Bulgaria